Norberto Castillo, O.P., was the 91st Rector Magnificus of the University of Santo Tomas (UST), the oldest and the largest Catholic university in Asia, from 1982–1990.

References

Living people
People from Tacloban
Filipino Dominicans
Academic staff of the University of Santo Tomas
University of Santo Tomas alumni
Filipino non-fiction writers
Year of birth missing (living people)
Rector Magnificus of the University of Santo Tomas